San Bernardo (also, Bernardo) is a town and seat of the municipality of San Bernardo in the state of Durango in Mexico. As of 2010, the town had a population of 700.

References

Fotos de Fotos de San Bernardo, Durango

Populated places in Durango